David Harding is a Welsh international lawn bowler and indoor.

Bowls career

Outdoors
In 2009, he won the triples and fours bronze medals at the Atlantic Bowls Championships In 2011, he won three gold medals at the European Bowls Championships in Portugal.

He is a three times Welsh National champion winning the 2002 and 2021 fours and 2015 pairs at the Welsh National Bowls Championships and became a British champion winning the 2003 fours at the British Isles Bowls Championships.

Harding is a former board member of Welsh Bowls and holds the record for most appearances for South Glamorgan.

Indoors
Harding has also been capped by the Welsh indoor national team.

References

Living people
Welsh male bowls players
Year of birth missing (living people)
Bowls European Champions